A water bath can refer to:

 A bain-marie or double boiler
 A heated bath
 A laboratory water bath
 A method of home canning

A steam bath can refer to:
 A steambath
 A play called Steambath

See also 
 Sous-vide, a cooking technique that uses a water bath